Al-Mu'ayyad (died 866) was the son of an Abbasid caliph.

Al-Mu'ayyad may also refer to:

Al-Mu'ayyad (newspaper), a pan-Islamic, anti-British newspaper in Egypt 
A number of Imams of Yemen are called Al-Mu'ayyad:
Al-Mu'ayyad Ahmad (944–1020)
Al-Mu'ayyad Yahya (1270–1346) 
Al-Mu'ayyad Muhammad (died 1503)
Al-Mu'ayyad Muhammad (1582–1644)
Al-Mu'ayyad Muhammad II (1634–1686)
Al-Mu'ayyad Abbas (died 1880)
Al-Mu'ayyad fi'l-Din al-Shirazi (1000–1078), an Isma'ili scholar and theologian
 Al-Malik al-Mu'ayyad (Shaykh al-Mahmudi, reigned 1412–1421), a Mamluk sultan
Mosque of Sultan al-Muayyad
Maristan of al-Mu'ayyad
Al-Malik al-Mu'ayyad (Shihab ad-Din Ahmad, reigned 1461), a Mamluk sultan

See also